Branigan Lake is a lake in Yosemite National Park, California.

Branigan Lake was named in the 1890s for a member of the military.

See also
List of lakes in California

References

Lakes of Tuolumne County, California
Lakes of Yosemite National Park